Gooding is an unincorporated community in Boulder County, Colorado, United States.

History
The Gooding School was established sometime between 1945 and 1956, near the banks of Boulder Creek. Gooding did not appear on topographic maps as a settlement until 1967.

References

Unincorporated communities in Boulder County, Colorado
Unincorporated communities in Colorado